Tango was a comics anthology published in Melbourne, Australia by Cardigan Comics, with nine issues of Tango, published intermittently from 1997 to 2009, and an additional compilation The Tango Collection, published in 2009 by Allen & Unwin.

Overview
Tango is described as "the Australian romance comics anthology".  Each issue features contributions by comic artists living and working in Melbourne and other parts of Australia and New Zealand.  The first three issues of Tango were large format publications, inspired by large format anthologies from the United States such as the early issues of RAW.  Later issues became smaller in format, and beginning with the fourth issue in 2001 (Tango Quatro), each has been sub-titled with a theme of "Love and ...".  Respectively, the themes for issues four through nine have been: 'Love and Death', 'Love and the Senses', 'Love and Sex', 'Love and Sedition' 'Love and Food', and 'Love and War'.  Drawing on contributions from the first eight issues of Tango, Allen and Unwin published The Tango Collection in 2009. In 2017-2018 the State Library of Victoria featured 'Tango' in its ongoing exhibition about the history of the book, 'The Mirror of the World'.

The Creator of Tango
Bernard Caleo was the creator and editor of Tango, as well as being a contributor to each issue.  Caleo is also a performer, speaker, interviewer, blogger and general promoter of comics and comic talent in Melbourne and more broadly in Australia and New Zealand.

Origins
Spurred by the disappearance of an earlier Australian comic anthology, Fox Comics, Caleo wanted to provide a vehicle for both experienced and new comic artists to demonstrate and develop their talents.  The chosen theme of romance is intended to evoke associations with both love and adventure.

Issues
There were nine issues of Tango, with the last issue Tango 9: Love and War published in December 2009.

Tango
Published: 1997
Edited by: Bernard Caleo
Cover: Anita Baĉić
pp. 44

Two to Tango
Published: 1998
Edited by: Bernard Caleo
Cover: Anita Baĉić
pp. 56

Tango One Two Three
Published: 1999
Edited by: Bernard Caleo, Jo Waite and Adam Possamaï
Cover: Anita Baĉić
pp. 60

Tango Quatro: Love and Death
Published: 2001
Edited by: Bernard Caleo
Cover: Anita Baĉić
pp. 100

Tango Five: Love and the Senses
Published: 2002
Edited by: Bernard Caleo
Cover: Anita Baĉić
pp. 142

Tango Six: Love and Sex
Published: 2005
Edited by: Bernard Caleo
Cover: Anita Baĉić
pp. 146

Tango Seven: Love and Sedition
Published: 2007
Edited by: Bernard Caleo
Cover: Anita Baĉić
pp. 152

Tango Eight: Love and Food
Published: 2008
Edited by: Bernard Caleo
Cover: Anita Baĉić
pp. 242

Tango Nine: Love and War
Published: 2009
Edited by: Bernard Caleo
Cover: Peter Ra
pp. 346

References

Australian comic strips
1997 comics debuts
Romance comics